Entitlement commodities are food commodities purchased by the USDA for the purpose of meeting legislatively specified rates of commodity assistance for various food assistance programs (e.g., school lunches). These commodities may be in government holdings as a result of agricultural surplus removal or price support activities carried out under a variety of agriculture laws, but more commonly they are items purchased to meet food program needs.

References 

United States Department of Agriculture